This is a list of Curaçao national football team games in 2012.

2012 games

References

2012
2012 national football team results
2011–12 in Curaçao football
2012–13 in Curaçao football